Ulrich Thomsen (born 6 December 1963) is a Danish actor and filmmaker, known for his role of Kai Proctor in the Cinemax original series Banshee (2013–2016).

Biography
Ulrich Thomsen was born in (Næsby) Odense, Denmark and graduated from the Danish National School of Theatre and Contemporary Dance in 1993, after which he performed in several theatres in Copenhagen, such as Dr. Dantes Aveny, Mungo Park and Østre Gasværks Teater.

His film debut was in 1994 in Nightwatch, directed by Ole Bornedal. Since then, he has starred in a number of roles including, among others, Thomas Vinterberg's The Biggest Heroes (1996), Susanne Bier's Sekten (1997) and Anders Thomas Jensen's Flickering Lights (2000). The major breakthrough in his career came in the 1998 film Festen followed by an important role in the James Bond film The World Is Not Enough (1999) portraying the part of henchman Sasha Davidov.

This established Thomsen as an international actor, famous outside his native Denmark. He played a part in the 2002 English film Killing Me Softly. In 2009, he played Jonas Skarssen, the lead villain in Tom Tykwer's The International. From 2013 to 2016 he stars as series regular in Banshee playing the role of primary antagonist, Kai Proctor. Aside from his native language Danish, Thomsen is fluent in German and English. He is vegan.

Filmography

Film

Television

Web series

References

External links
 
 

1963 births
Danish male film actors
Living people
20th-century Danish male actors
21st-century Danish male actors
Danish film producers
Danish film directors
Danish male screenwriters
Danish male television actors
Best Actor Bodil Award winners
People from Odense
Best Actor Robert Award winners